Dan Skelton is a British horse trainer who trains racehorses that compete in National Hunt racing. Skelton is the son of British Olympic gold medallist Nick Skelton and the older brother of champion jockey Harry Skelton.

Skelton spent nine years working at the stables of Paul Nicholls and set up his own stables in 2013 in Warwickshire.

Cheltenham Festival winners (6)
 David Nicholson Mares' Hurdle - (1) Roksana (2019)
 County Handicap Hurdle - (4) Superb Story (2016), Mohaayed (2018), Ch'tibello (2019), Faivoir (2023)
 Coral Cup - (1) Langer Dan (2023)

Major wins
 Great Britain
 Henry VIII Novices' Chase - (1) Allmankind (2020)
 Kauto Star Novices' Chase - (1) Shan Blue (2020)
 Finale Juvenile Hurdle - (1) Allmankind (2019)
 Manifesto Novices' Chase - (1) Protektorat (2021)
 Betfair Chase - (1) Protektorat (2022)
 Mersey Novices' Hurdle - (1) My Drogo (2021)

References

External links
Official website

Living people
British racehorse trainers
Year of birth missing (living people)